Ivan Vasylyovych Mykolaichuk (15 June 1941, Chortoryia, Ukrainian SSR – 3 August 1987) was a Ukrainian actor, producer, and screen writer.

He is best known for playing the Hutsul Ivan in Shadows of Forgotten Ancestors (Тіні забутих предків) (1964), based on Mykhailo Kotsyubynsky's book of the same name. He received the Komsomol prize of Ukraine in 1967, and the title of Meritorious Artist of the Ukrainian SSR in 1968. He posthumously received the Taras Shevchenko prize.

Biography
Mykolaichuk was born in a village of Chortoryia (Kitsman Raion) in Western Ukraine during World War II in a family of peasants. Ivan graduated from a high school of the neighboring village of Brusnytsia (Kitsman Raion). In 1957, he finished the Chernivtsi Music College and in 1961 he graduated from the theater-studio of the Chernivtsi Music-Drama Theater of Kobylyanska. On August 29, 1962 Ivan married an actress of the theater (later the People's Artist of Ukraine) Maria Karpiuk.

In 1963-65, he studied in the Karpenko-Karyi Memorial Kyiv Institute of Theatrical Arts (instructor - Viktor Ivchenko). During those years, Ivan debuted in the Leonid Osyka's movie Dvoye (The two).

His films were often controversial and suppressed by the Soviet authorities; sometimes his films were banned from being screened by the KGB. Due to incidents with the Parajanov's film Shadows of Forgotten Ancestors Mykolaichuk was banned from film industry for some five years by the party authorities being recognized as too nationalistic and a person of hostile ideology. The movie, Shadows of Forgotten Ancestors, that received the Gold Prize of the 7th Moscow International Film Festival in 1971, was perceived almost as a hostile attack by nationalistic forces.

In 1979 with the help of Volodymyr Ivashko who worked as the secretary of ideological work in the Kharkiv Regional Committee of the Communist Party of Ukraine, Mykolaichuk was given permission to participate in the movie Babylon 20th (Вавилон ХХ).

Mykolaichuk died in August 1987 at the age of 46. His house in Chortoryia, Kitsman Raion, Chernivtsi Oblast, has since been turned into a museum. He left a lasting legacy on Ukrainian film. Many consider him to be the greatest actor in the history of Ukrainian Cinematography. He also inspired other Ukrainian artists, actors, singers and writers who were searching for their Ukrainian identity in the Soviet era.

Filmography

Accolades
 Lenin Komsomol Prize of the Ukrainian SSR (1967)
 Distinguished Artist of the Ukrainian SSR (1968)
 Shevchenko State Prize of the Ukrainian SSR (1988 posthumously) for performance of roles of Taras Shevchenko, Ivan Paliychuk, Davyd Motuzka, Hryhoriy Hromov, Petro Dzvonar, Fabian, and Hryhoriy Korchak in films "Dream", "Shadows of Forgotten Ancestors", "Weed", "Commissars", "White Bird with Black Mark", "Babylon-XX", and "Such late, such warm Autumn"

References

External links

Biography

1941 births
1987 deaths
People from Chernivtsi Oblast
Ukrainian male film actors
Recipients of the Shevchenko National Prize
Kyiv National I. K. Karpenko-Kary Theatre, Cinema and Television University alumni
Soviet male film actors
Burials at Baikove Cemetery
Dovzhenko Film Studios actors